Mortal Kombat Gold is a 1999 fighting game in the Mortal Kombat series that was published by Midway Games. It was developed by Eurocom and released exclusively on the Dreamcast as a launch title. It is an updated version of 1997's Mortal Kombat 4 and was the first game to appear on a sixth-generation platform as well as the only Mortal Kombat game to be released for the Dreamcast console. Critical reaction was mostly average due to the graphics being inferior to the arcade version, the weapons deemed boring or useless, and game-breaking bugs and glitches.

Gameplay
Mortal Kombat Gold's gameplay is largely based on that of Mortal Kombat 4 and includes several additional characters and stages not seen in Mortal Kombat 4, as well as a new weapon selection mechanism. New stages include Church, Ladder, Netherrealm and Soul Chamber.

Characters

Mortal Kombat Gold features the same character roster as Mortal Kombat 4, which includes Liu Kang, Jax Briggs, Sonya Blade, Johnny Cage, Sub-Zero, Reiko, Jarek, Raiden, Tanya, Scorpion, Kai, Reptile, Fujin, Shinnok, Quan Chi, sub-boss Goro, and the secret characters Noob Saibot and Meat. In addition, Gold also features six additional characters, Kitana, Mileena, Cyrax, Kung Lao, Baraka and secret character Sektor, who were not featured in any version of Mortal Kombat 4 but had been featured in previous installments of the franchise.

Although the game's storyline is identical to that of Mortal Kombat 4, the official strategy guide for the game misprinted unused bios for the six new returning characters, causing some confusion among fans.

An additional character named Belokk was planned for the game, but was omitted from the finished version due to time constraints. However, Eurocom accidentally sent information about the character to Game Informer, and as a result, six screenshots of him were released to the public, sparking rumors about him being actually accessible somehow.

Development
The game was showcased at E3 1999.

Release
About a month after the initial launch, a revised version of the game was released, which intended to address some of its most severe issues. This version fixed the most severe bugs and glitches in the game and added VMU memory card support, which allowed the save feature to function properly. This version was released on a red tinted disc, as opposed to the original's gold tint, and was easily identified by a green "Hot! New!" logo on the instruction manual's cover.

Reception

Mortal Kombat Gold received an averaged review score of only 55% at GameRankings. Despite having the graphics that were the most faithful to the arcade version of all the home versions of Mortal Kombat 4, Game Revolution rated it a D and commented that "the graphics are inexcusably horrible" and "it's quite a depressing let-down on Sega's 128-bit masterpiece, especially when compared to Soulcalibur." The weapons that characters can use during the game were called "dull and uninteresting", often having little relation to the characters, and being "either a sword, axe, or club". IGN was less negative toward the game, awarding it a 6.3 out of 10, but was particularly critical regarding the weapon system: "Readying your weapon is a slow process in which one can be hit any number of times during the attempt". Although IGN commented on the improvements from previous Mortal Kombat games, the lack of depth was considered inexcusable. Jeff Gerstmann of GameSpot, who gave the game a score of 5.0/10, wrote that "sitting down and playing MK Gold almost feels like a retrogaming experience - you really feel as though you've pulled out some old game that you haven't played in years - and it hasn't aged gracefully." According to a retrospective by IGN, "the same publications that had once praised it on Nintendo 64 were happy to thrash it as a shallow and campy relic of a past age. Releasing beside Soulcalibur certainly didn't help."

Jeff Lundrigan reviewed the Dreamcast version of the game for Next Generation, rating it two stars out of five, and stated that "Mortal Kombat Gold goes a long way towards confirming that this series peaked with MK2, and it's been in steady decline ever since."

Conversely, Brazilian magazine SuperGamePower gave the game 4.5 out 5, regarding the graphics as superior to anything came up by Ed Boon and John Tobias on console or arcade. The magazine also recommends the game to fight fans, particularly those who favor the Mortal Kombat series.

References

External links

Mortal Kombat Gold at Radgegaming

1999 video games
3D fighting games
Dreamcast games
Dreamcast-only games
Eurocom games
Cancelled arcade video games
Midway video games
Mortal Kombat games
Video games developed in the United Kingdom
Multiplayer and single-player video games